Nicholforest is a civil parish in Cumbria, England bordering Scotland. The population of the civil parish taken at the 2011 census was 372. The parish covers an area that extends about 10 miles east to west and 2 miles north to south. The area was once an extensive forest between England and Scotland, and was a centre for commercial forestry by the Forestry Commission. Today there are still many trees, watered by the River Liddle
In 1870–72 John Marius Wilson's Imperial Gazetteer of England and Wales described the landscape as:
"The surface is hilly. The streams Kershope and Liddel here form several cascades."

Demographics

According to National Statistics (2011) the population of Nicholforest accounted to 372. Over the designated area of the Nicholsforest parish in 2011 this accounted to a population density of 0.1² person per hectare, this is lower than both the Non-metropolitan area of Carlisle in Cumbria; at 1.0² person per hectare, and also the average population density of England at 4.1² persons per hectare. According to Neighbourhood Statistic all 177 dwellings within the Parish are Unshared dwellings with the majority of those lying between 2 and 4 bedrooms. 
Nicholforest experiences slightly lower Unemployment levels (3.1%) than both Carlisle (3.6%) and England (4.4%) but has higher proportion of retirees (22.3% compared with 15.5% and 13.7% respectively). Since 1881 employment structure in Nicholforest has remained dedicated to the agricultural sector, as this remains the most prominent sector followed by Wholesale and Retail Trade.

It may be noteworthy that the depicted uncharacteristic rise in population starting in 1941 census data occurred as a result of changing border boundaries in 1939. The Nicholforest Parish has characteristics of an affluent Rural area with little services or significant economy activity within the Parish borders, and is mostly used for residential purposes only.

History

“Beginning 1 July 1837, births, deaths and marriages, regardless of religious affiliation, were recorded with Civil Registration Offices in Cumbria, as in the rest of England". This signified the Beginning of official records and identification of Parishes such as Nicholforest.

According to Nicholforest official parish website, historically being located on the border between England and Scotland caused social tensions. "Border Reivers were raiders along the Anglo–Scottish border from the late 13th century to the beginning of the 17th century. Their ranks consisted of both Scottish and English families, and they raided the entire border country without regard to their victims' nationality".  As a result of this it has been documented that "There was fighting (or feuds) between families on the same side of the Border and across the border. Marriage across the Border could result in the death penalty but such unions did occur … regularly."

Notable establishments

Church of St Nicholas

“St Nicholas' Church, Nicholforest, is an old and humble parish church with nave, chancel and apse. There is a small wooden bell turret with a spire. There are many stained glass windows, all by John Scott & son, with a five light East window depicting Christ the Good Shepherd flanked by the four Evangelists."
“The church of St Nicholas is located at the gates of Kingfield House, in a semi wooded situation about half a mile from the village hall. Built in 1866, it is Gothic architecture in style, to a design by Alexander Graham of London." "The church was entirely rebuilt and enlarged by the addition of a chancel in 1866, at a cost of £2,000. It is a handsome stone building, lighted by several stained glass windows." The church is recorded in the National Heritage List for England as a designated Grade II listed building.

The current clergyman of this Church of England is The Revd Brett Murphy

Village Hall

“Until the 1960s, dances were held at Scuggate in a wooden hut known as "The Border Hall".", "Eventually, a wooden hut was built, on the site of our present-day Village Hall.  This hut was a popular meeting place amongst locals and it was used regularly.  In the summer, there would be Sports Days, Fancy Dress competitions, Bowls etc."
Currently "Nicholforest Village Hall plays a central role in the community. It is a registered charity that is devoted to fostering a community spirit. Much of the committee's efforts go into maintaining the village hall and promoting its use for group activities." This includes Nicholforest Art group, Parent and toddler groups, and Women's Institute evenings every Wednesday.

As the village hall is situated in a sparsely populated rural area it is important to provide facilities such as a car park and Ramp for disabled access.
The Village hall also provides a book drop facility operating within the Penton area.

See also

Listed buildings in Nicholforest

References

External links
 Cumbria County History Trust: Nichol Forest (nb: provisional research only – see Talk page)

Civil parishes in Cumbria
City of Carlisle